Lino Schmidek Machado Facioli (born 29 July 2000) is a Brazilian-British actor. He is best known for portraying Lord Robin Arryn in Game of Thrones and Naples in Get Him to the Greek.

Biography
Facioli was born in Ribeirão Preto, São Paulo state. He is of Austrian, Portuguese, Italian and German descent. Lino's maternal grandfather, Werner Robert Schmidek, was born in Vienna, Austria, and emigrated to Brazil in 1960. He moved to the United Kingdom with his family when he was 4 years old.

Career
He showed an interest in an acting career at age 7 when he was enrolled in a theater school in London. In 2010, he began his career with appearances in short metrages and television series. His first professional work was in the British short film Awfully Deep in 2010 from director Daniel Florêncio. In the same year, he joined the cast of Get Him to the Greek, acting as the son of actor Russell Brand. He played the troublesome Robin Arryn, Lord of a noble family in the series Game of Thrones.

In 2014, he starred the Brazilian film O Menino no Espelho, working alongside the Brazilian actors Mateus Solano, Regiane Alves and Laura Neiva.

In 2019 he starred in the British teen comedy Netflix series Sex Education.

Filmography

Film

Television

References

External links 

 
 

Living people
2000 births
21st-century Brazilian male actors
21st-century British male actors
Brazilian people of Austrian descent
Brazilian people of Italian descent
Brazilian people of Portuguese descent
Brazilian people of German descent
Brazilian male child actors
Brazilian male film actors
Brazilian expatriates in the United Kingdom
British actors of Latin American descent
British male child actors
British male film actors
Male actors from São Paulo (state)
Male actors from London
People from Ribeirão Preto